Heroes Are Hard to Find is the ninth studio album by the British-American rock band Fleetwood Mac, released on 13 September 1974. This is the last album recorded with Bob Welch, who left the band at the end of 1974. It was the first Fleetwood Mac studio album recorded in the United States, in Los Angeles. 

The album was recorded during a low point for the group, with Welch's personal conflict with drummer Mick Fleetwood causing a temporary disbandment, which led to subsequent legal problems when manager Clifford Davis organized a completely new lineup using the Fleetwood Mac name to fulfill their remaining tour dates. When the situation was being settled, the original band reformed and Welch was persuaded to return for one more album, but left permanently by the end of 1974.

The title track was edited and issued as a single but it failed to chart. Cash Box said of the title song that "tight sweet harmonies back [lead singer Christine McVie] up with some excellent instrumentation". Even without a successful single to support the album, it still managed to peak at No. 34 on the Billboard 200 chart, which at the time was the highest Billboard placing for any Fleetwood Mac album. It also reached No. 5 on the Billboard FM Action chart.

Bob Welch later re-recorded "Angel", "Bermuda Triangle" and "Silver Heels" for His Fleetwood Mac Years & Beyond (2003). A re-write of "Silver Heels", titled "Hustler", with explicit lyrics appeared on Bob Welch Looks at Bop (1999).

Reception

Track listing

Personnel
Fleetwood Mac
Bob Welch – electric guitar, acoustic guitar, vibraphone, lead vocals, backing vocals
Christine McVie – keyboard, ARP String Ensemble, lead vocals, backing vocals 
John McVie – bass guitar
Mick Fleetwood – drums, percussion

Additional personnel
Sneaky Pete Kleinow – pedal steel guitar on "Come a Little Bit Closer"
Nick DeCaro – horn and string arrangement

Production
Fleetwood Mac – producers
Bob Hughes – engineer, producer
Doug Graves – engineer, assistant engineer
Lee Herschberg – remastering
Desmond Strobel – design

Charts

References

Fleetwood Mac albums
1974 albums
Reprise Records albums
Albums produced by John McVie
Albums produced by Mick Fleetwood
Albums produced by Christine McVie
Albums produced by Bob Welch (musician)